Mark Ames (born October 3, 1965) is a Brooklyn-based American journalist. He was the editor of the biweekly the eXile in Moscow, from its founding in 1997 until its closure in 2008. Ames has also written for the New York Press, PandoDaily, The Nation, Playboy, The San Jose Mercury News, Alternet, Птюч Connection, GQ (Russian edition), and is the author of three books. He co-hosts the podcast Radio War Nerd along with John Dolan.

Biography
Ames was raised in Saratoga, California, where he attended an Episcopalian private school. Ames is Jewish. He graduated from Saratoga High School in 1983. He later wrote about a 2003 alleged bombing attempt at his alma mater in Going Postal—Rage, Murder and Rebellion: From Reagan's Workplaces to Clinton's Columbine and Beyond.

After leaving Saratoga, Ames attended the University of California, Berkeley, while living with his father (his parents divorced when Ames was eight years old). He later described how his college years shaped his later political views in a section of the book The Exile: Sex, Drugs, and Libel in the New Russia:

After college, Ames lived in New York City, Boston, San Francisco, and Prague, and played briefly in a punk band. He also tried writing screenplays.

In August 1991, he visited Europe, spending two weeks in St. Petersburg (at that time called Leningrad). Though he returned to live in Foster City, California, he continued thinking of Russia, and delved into Russian literature. After spending mid-1992 to early 1993 in Prague, Ames moved to Moscow. In 1995, he published "The Rise and Fall of Moscow's Expat 'Royalty'" in the English-language Moscow newspaper The Moscow Times, and was shortly thereafter hired by its competitor Living Here.

Time at the eXile 
In 1997, he established the eXile, for which he was writer and editor. Shortly after founding it, he hired Matt Taibbi. In The eXile, Ames wrote on politics, organized crime in Russia, prostitution, and drug use. The paper played practical jokes on Pravda staffers and public figures including Mikhail Gorbachev. In 2000 Ames and Taibbi published The eXile: Sex, Drugs, and Libel in the New Russia. Chicago Reader contributor Martha Bayne reviewed the book, and wrote: "The product of Ames and Taibbi's union is rude, cruel, pornographic, self-aggrandizing, infantile, and breathtakingly misogynist, with a dozen pages of news and another dozen of gonzo entertainment listings. It's also one of the biggest success stories of the tiny, incestuous world of expatriate Moscow. Pranks are sharper – and meaner – than others, but they're all conceived under a towering belief in the righteousness of the paper's mission. The eXile has kept up a holy racket, railing away against stupidity, corruption, and influence peddling . . . It has covered mind-numbingly complex topics like privatization in a straightforward style that's not only comprehensible but actually interesting to a reader with no background in Russian economic history and little enthusiasm for acquiring one."

In June 2008, the eXile website was closed down by the Russian government and Ames returned to the U.S. Ames continues to edit the eXile in an online-only format: eXiledonline.

After the eXile 
Ames became senior editor at Paul Carr's Not Safe For Work Corporation website in August 2012.

Ames is currently the co-host of the popular podcast Radio War Nerd with John Dolan, which has more than 4,300 subscribers on Patreon. According to Kelley Beaucar Vlahos of Responsible Statecraft, in February 2023 Ames was the first journalist to interview Seymour Hersh after his blogpost alleging that the US government blew up the Nord Stream pipelines.

Bibliography
The eXile: Sex, Drugs, and Libel in the New Russia.  Co-authored with Matt Taibbi, and published in 2000 with a foreword by Edward Limonov. 
В Россию с любовью (Записки американского изгоя), Мама Пресс, 2002. available in Russia.  The title can be translated as To Russia with Love (Notes from an American Outcast).
Going Postal: Rage, Murder, and Rebellion: From Reagan's Workplaces to Clinton's Columbine and Beyond, 2005.

References

External links 

 The Exile - an English language, Moscow-based, semi-weekly alternative paper
 Exile Online - the new site of the Exile
 Democracy Now interview with Amy Goodman, Greg Palast, and Dan Briody December 8, 2003
 AlterNet, October 3, 2005, "A Brief History of Rage, Murder and Rebellion" - interview with Ames
 "A Brief History of Rage, Murder and Rebellion" - Our Man in Moscow: The true story of how a nice kid from Los Gatos moved to Moscow, pranked the media and ended up in the crosshairs of the Russian government and a U.S. congressman

1965 births
Living people
American male writers
University of California, Berkeley alumni
People from Foster City, California
American expatriates in Russia
People from Saratoga, California
Russian newspaper editors
American newspaper editors
American Jews